The Secretary for Lands and Works was one of the first ministries in the colonial administration of New South Wales following the establishment of responsible government in 1856.

Role and responsibilities
Under the principles of responsible government, the minister was accountable to parliament not only for the decisions personally made by the minister but was also accountable for the performance of the department. While the first minister Bob Nichols was appointed on 6 June 1856, the department of Lands and Public Works was not formally established until 26 August 1856. The department had three main functions:

 The administration of lands, including the Surveyor General, Chief Commissioner for Crown Lands, Commissioners for reporting Claims to Grants of Land, Commissioners of Crown Lands for the Gold Districts, Botanical Gardens and Domains, Inspectors of Diseased Sheep, Coal Fields and Coal Mines, Church and School Estates.
 The administration of public works which was responsible for railways, roads and electric telegraph; harbours and river navigation, the Civil Engineer (Dry Docks, Cockatoo Island) and the Colonial Architect and
A Board of Works which oversaw how Treasury funds were spent on public works.

The diversity of the ministers responsibilities included the government flock of Alpacas and Llamas.

In 1859 the ministry was split into the Secretary for Lands and the Secretary for Public Works.

List of Secretaries for Lands and Works

References

Defunct government positions of New South Wales